Gavan railway station is a proposed railway station in Raigad district, Maharashtra. Its code is GAVAN. It will serve Gavan and Jasai  area of Navi Mumbai. The station may consist of two platforms.

References

Railway stations in Raigad district
Mumbai CR railway division
Transport in Navi Mumbai
Proposed railway stations in India
Mumbai Suburban Railway stations